MIS Quarterly Executive is a quarterly journal covering the management of information systems. The journal was founded in 2002.Its purpose is to encourage practice-based research in the IS field and to disseminate the results of that research into a much more relevant manner to practitioners. It is a journal of TheAssociation for Information Systems. It is based in Atlanta, Georgia.

References

External links
 

Information systems
Association for Information Systems academic journals
Information systems journals
Business and management journals
Quarterly journals
Publications established in 2002
Magazines published in Georgia (U.S. state)